Central South may refer to

 Transport
 Central South station, proposed Mass Transit Railway station in Hong Kong
 Central South African Railways

 Geography
 Mainland Southeast Asia, sometimes called "Middle South Peninsula" (中南半島) or "Indo-china"
 South Central China, or literally "Central South" (中南) in Chinese, a region of the People's Republic of China containing Central China and South China 
 Zanzibar Central/South Region, Tanzania
 Central South Philadelphia, Philadelphia, Pennsylvania, United States

 Other
 Central Independent Television, successor of Central South, television station in Midlands, United Kingdom
 Central South University, university in Changsha, Hunan, People's Republic of China
 Multinational Division Central-South, part of the Multinational Force Iraq

See also
South Central (disambiguation)